Bruce Caldwell (February 8, 1906 – February 15, 1959) was an outfielder and first baseman for the Cleveland Indians and Brooklyn Dodgers as well as an American football running back in the National Football League for the New York Giants.  He attended Brown University and Yale University.

References

External links

1906 births
1959 deaths
American football running backs
Major League Baseball outfielders
Brooklyn Dodgers players
Brown Bears football players
Cleveland Indians players
New York Giants players
Yale Bulldogs football players
Albany Senators players
Harrisburg Senators players
Hartford Senators players
Minneapolis Millers (baseball) players
New Haven Bulldogs players
New Haven Profs players
People from Cumberland, Rhode Island
Players of American football from Rhode Island
Baseball players from Rhode Island